Michel Doury (1931–2007) was a French writer and translator (in particular Thomas Pynchon, Raymond Chandler, Richard Brautigan and Leonard Cohen). In 1969, he won the Roger Nimier Prize with his work L'indo. In 1988 he was awarded the Prix Mottart by the Académie française.

Work 
1965: La Paix des braves, Julliard
1967: Un matin froid, 
1968: Le Jardin anglais, Julliard
1969: L'Indo, Julliard
1971: La Chasse en octobre, Julliard
1972: Le Petit Requiem, followed by Pour Déroulède
1977: Le Grand Soir, Éditions de la Table ronde
1986: Monsieur Léopold, 
1987: Vive l'empereur, Éditions Balland

External links 
 Michel Doury on data.bnf.fr
 Michel Doury on the site of the Académie française
 List of his translations on Sens Critique

20th-century French non-fiction writers
English–French translators
Roger Nimier Prize winners
1931 births
2007 deaths
20th-century translators